Yamaha SZR660 is a  sport bike with a   single-cylinder engine, produced by Yamaha Motor Corporation from 1996 to 2001. It was built in Italy by the Italian Yamaha importer Belgarda. It shares its engine with Yamaha's XTZ660 Ténéré line of dual-purpose on/off-road motorcycles, but employs this engine within a Supermono package.

The 660 engine incorporates a five-valve cylinder-head. There are three intake and two exhaust valves. The bike is designed so that the smaller valves have a larger area at a lower weight than a four valve system and allow maximum intake flow and velocity.

A vacuum operated fuel pump is mounted on the bottom of the fuel tank to lift the contents of the tank to the twin carburetors.
The fuel system incorporates one slide carb and one butterfly carb. These are operated sequentially by a manually adjustable system.

SZR660
Motorcycles introduced in 1996
Sport bikes